Caminito ("little walkway" or "little path" in Spanish) is a street museum and a traditional alley, located in La Boca, a neighborhood of Buenos Aires, Argentina. The place acquired cultural significance because it inspired the music for the famous tango "Caminito" (1926), composed by Juan de Dios Filiberto.

History

During the 1800s, a small stream flowing into the Riachuelo River ran along the same route where the Caminito is now. Later that century, this area of the stream became known as the Puntin, the Genoese diminutive term for bridge (a small bridge allowed people to cross the stream there). When the stream dried up, tracks for the Ferrocarril Buenos Aires y Puerto de la Ensenada were installed at the site. Disused tracks remain at the end of Caminito, along Garibaldi Street.

In 1954, the railroad closed, and the area where Caminito was became a landfill and the neighborhood's eyesore. Over the following three years, Argentine artist Benito Quinquela Martín who lived nearby, painstakingly prepared the walls facing the abandoned street, applying pastel colors, and by 1960 had a stage put up at the southern end; the wooden-plank stage was replaced with a nearby theatre house in 1972. The artist was a personal friend of Argentine tango composer Juan de Dios Filiberto, who created a well-known 1926 tune by the same name.

External links

 Caminito Street in La Boca neighbourhood

Streets in Buenos Aires
Pedestrian streets in Argentina